This list is of Major Sites Protected for their Historical and Cultural Value at the National Level in the Province of Heilongjiang, People's Republic of China.

List

|}

As well as sites protected at the national level, there are also sites in Heilongjiang that are protected at the provincial level (see 黑龙江省文物保护单位).

See also
 Principles for the Conservation of Heritage Sites in China

References

External links

 

 
Heilongjiang